The  started at the beginning of the Neolithic in Japan, continued through the Bronze Age, and towards its end crossed into the Iron Age.

Since the 1980s, scholars have argued that a period previously classified as a transition from the Jōmon period should be reclassified as Early Yayoi. The date of the beginning of this transition is controversial, with estimates ranging from the 10th to the 3rd centuries BC.

The period is named after the neighbourhood of Tokyo where archaeologists first uncovered artifacts and features from that era in the late 19th century. Distinguishing characteristics of the Yayoi period include the appearance of new Yayoi pottery styles, improved carpentry and architecture, and the start of an intensive rice agriculture in paddy fields. A hierarchical social class structure dates from this period and has its origin in China. Techniques in metallurgy based on the use of bronze and iron were also introduced from China via Korea to Japan in this period.

The Yayoi followed the Jōmon period and Yayoi culture flourished in a geographic area from southern Kyūshū to northern Honshū. Archaeological evidence supports the idea that during this time, an influx of farmers (Yayoi People) from the Korean Peninsula to Japan overwhelmed and mixed with the native predominantly hunter-gatherer population (Jomon).

Features 

The Yayoi period is generally accepted to date from 300 BCE to 300 CE. However, although highly controversial, radiocarbon evidence from organic samples attached to pottery shards may suggest a date up to 500 years earlier, between 1,000 BC and 800 BC. During this period Japan transitioned to a settled agricultural society using agricultural methods that were introduced to the country, initially in the Kyushu region, from Korea.

The earliest archaeological evidence of the Yayoi is found on northern Kyūshū, but that is still debated. Yayoi culture quickly spread to the main island of Honshū, mixing with native Jōmon culture. 
The name Yayoi is borrowed from a location in Tokyo where pottery of the Yayoi period was first found. Yayoi pottery was simply decorated and produced using the same coiling technique previously used in Jōmon pottery. Yayoi craft specialists made bronze ceremonial bells (dōtaku), mirrors, and weapons. By the 1st century AD, Yayoi people began using iron agricultural tools and weapons.

As the Yayoi population increased, the society became more stratified and complex. They wove textiles, lived in permanent farming villages, and constructed buildings with wood and stone. They also accumulated wealth through land ownership and the storage of grain. Such factors promoted the development of distinct social classes. Contemporary Chinese sources described the people as having tattoos and other bodily markings which indicated differences in social status. Yayoi chiefs, in some parts of Kyūshū, appear to have sponsored, and politically manipulated, trade in bronze and other prestige objects. That was made possible by the introduction of an irrigated, wet-rice agriculture from the Yangtze estuary in southern China via the Ryukyu Islands or Korean Peninsula. Wet-rice agriculture led to the development and growth of a sedentary, agrarian society in Japan. Local political and social developments in Japan were more important than the activities of the central authority within a stratified society.

Direct comparisons between Jōmon and Yayoi skeletons show that the two peoples are noticeably distinguishable. The Jōmon tended to be shorter, with relatively longer forearms and lower legs, more deep-set eyes, shorter and wider faces, and much more pronounced facial topography. They also have strikingly raised brow ridges, noses, and nose bridges. Yayoi people, on the other hand, averaged 2.5 cm - 5 cm taller, with shallow-set eyes, high and narrow faces, and flat brow ridges and noses. By the Kofun period, almost all skeletons excavated in Japan except those of the Ainu are of the Yayoi type with some having small Jomon admixture, resembling those of modern-day Japanese.

History

Origin of the Yayoi people

The origin of Yayoi culture and the Yayoi people has long been debated. The earliest archaeological sites are Itazuke or Nabata in the northern part of Kyūshū. Contacts between fishing communities on this coast and the southern coast of Korea date from the Jōmon period, as witnessed by the exchange of trade items such as fishhooks and obsidian. During the Yayoi period, cultural features from Korea and China arrived in this area at various times over several centuries, and later spread to the south and east. This was a period of mixture between immigrants and the indigenous population, and between new cultural influences and existing practices.

Chinese influence was obvious in the bronze and copper weapons, dōkyō, dōtaku, as well as irrigated paddy rice cultivation. Three major symbols of Yayoi culture are the bronze mirror, the bronze sword, and the royal seal stone.

Between 1996 and 1999, a team led by Satoshi Yamaguchi, a researcher at Japan's National Museum of Nature and Science, compared Yayoi remains found in Japan's Yamaguchi and Fukuoka prefectures with those from China's coastal Jiangsu province and found many similarities between the Yayoi and the Jiangsu remains.

Further links to the Korean Peninsula have been discovered, and several researchers have reported discoveries/evidence that strongly link the Yayoi culture to the southern part of the Korean Peninsula. Mark J. Hudson has cited archaeological evidence that included "bounded paddy fields, new types of polished stone tools, wooden farming implements, iron tools, weaving technology, ceramic storage jars, exterior bonding of clay coils in pottery fabrication, ditched settlements, domesticated pigs, and jawbone rituals". The migrant transfusion from the Korean peninsula gains strength because Yayoi culture began on the north coast of Kyūshū, where Japan is closest to Korea. Yayoi pottery, burial mounds, and food preservation were discovered to be very similar to the pottery of southern Korea.

However, some scholars argue that the rapid increase of roughly four million people in Japan between the Jōmon and Yayoi periods cannot be explained by migration alone. They attribute the increase primarily to a shift from a hunter-gatherer to an agricultural diet on the islands, with the introduction of rice. It is quite likely that rice cultivation and its subsequent deification allowed for a slow and gradual population increase. Regardless, there is archaeological evidence that supports the idea that there was an influx of farmers from the continent to Japan that absorbed or overwhelmed the native hunter-gatherer population.

Some pieces of Yayoi pottery clearly show the influence of Jōmon ceramics. In addition, the Yayoi lived in the same type of pit or circular dwelling as that of the Jōmon. Other examples of commonality are chipped stone tools for hunting, bone tools for fishing, shells in bracelet construction, and lacquer decoration for vessels and accessories.

According to several linguists, Japonic or proto-Japonic was present on large parts of the southern Korean peninsula. These Peninsular Japonic languages, now extinct, were eventually replaced by Koreanic languages. Similarly Whitman suggests that the Yayoi are not related to the proto-Koreans but that they (the Yayoi) were present on the Korean peninsula during the Mumun pottery period. According to him and several other researchers, Japonic/proto-Japonic arrived in the Korean peninsula around 1500 BC and was brought to the Japanese archipelago by Yayoi wet-rice farmers at some time between 700-300 BC. Whitman and Miyamoto associate Japonic as the language family associated with both Mumun and Yayoi cultures. Several linguists believe that speakers of Koreanic/proto-Koreanic arrived in the Korean Peninsula at some time after the Japonic/proto-Japonic speakers and coexisted with these peoples (i.e. the descendants of both the Mumun and Yayoi cultures) and possibly assimilated them. Both Koreanic and Japonic had prolonged influence on each other and a later founder effect diminished the internal variety of both language families.

Languages 

Most linguists and archaeologists agree that the Japonic language family was introduced to and spread through the archipelago during the Yayoi period.

Emergence of Wo in Chinese history texts 

The earliest written records about people in Japan are from Chinese sources from this period. Wo, the pronunciation of an early Chinese name for Japan, was mentioned in 57 AD; the Na state of Wo received a golden seal from the Emperor Guangwu of the Later Han dynasty. This event was recorded in the Book of the Later Han compiled by Fan Ye in the 5th century. The seal itself was discovered in northern Kyūshū in the 18th century. Wo was also mentioned in 257 in the Wei zhi, a section of the Records of the Three Kingdoms compiled by the 3rd-century scholar Chen Shou.

Early Chinese historians described Wo as a land of hundreds of scattered tribal communities rather than the unified land with a 700-year tradition as laid out in the 8th-century work Nihon Shoki, a partly mythical, partly historical account of Japan which dates the foundation of the country at 660 BC. Archaeological evidence also suggests that frequent conflicts between settlements or statelets broke out in the period. Many excavated settlements were moated or built at the tops of hills. Headless human skeletons discovered in Yoshinogari site are regarded as typical examples of finds from the period. In the coastal area of the Inland Sea, stone arrowheads are often found among funerary objects.

Third-century Chinese sources reported that the Wa people lived on raw fish, vegetables, and rice served on bamboo and wooden trays, clapped their hands in worship (something still done in Shinto shrines today), and built earthen-grave mounds. They also maintained vassal-master relations, collected taxes, had provincial granaries and markets, and observed mourning. Society was characterised by violent struggles.

Yamataikoku

The Wei Zhi, which is part of the Records of the three Kingdoms, first mentions Yamataikoku and Queen Himiko in the 3rd century. According to the record, Himiko assumed the throne of Wa, as a spiritual leader, after a major civil war. Her younger brother was in charge of the affairs of state, including diplomatic relations with the Chinese court of the Kingdom of Wei. When asked about their origins by the Wei embassy, the people of Wa claimed to be descendants of the Taibo of Wu, a historic figure of the Wu Kingdom around the Yangtze Delta of China.

For many years, the location of Yamataikoku and the identity of Queen Himiko have been subject of research. Two possible sites, Yoshinogari in Saga Prefecture and Makimuku in Nara Prefecture have been suggested. Recent archaeological research in Makimuku suggests that Yamataikoku was located in the area. Some scholars assume that the Hashihaka kofun in Makimuku was the tomb of Himiko. Its relation to the origin of the Yamato polity in the following Kofun period is also under debate.

See also 

 Japanese era name
 Ainu people
 Emishi people
 Yayoi people
 Wa (Japan)

References

Books cited

External links 

Yayoi Culture, Department of Asian Art, The Metropolitan Museum of Art
Yayoi period at Japanese History Online (under construction)
An article by Richard Hooker on the Yayoi and the Jōmon.
Comprehensive Database of Archaeological Site Reports in Japan,  Nara National Research Institute for Cultural Properties
Article "Japanese Roots Surprisingly Shallow" from Japan Times

 
Japanese eras
Ancient peoples
Archaeological cultures of East Asia
4th-century BC establishments in Japan
4th-century disestablishments in Japan